The 1987 World Juniors Track Cycling Championships were the 13th annual Junior World Championships for track cycling held in Dalmine, Italy in August 1987.

The Championships had five events for men (Sprint, Points race, Individual pursuit, Team pursuit and 1 kilometre time trial) and two for women (Individual pursuit and Sprint).

Events

Medal table

References

UCI Juniors Track World Championships
1987 in track cycling
1987 in Italian sport